The 1961 Kangaroo Tour of New Zealand was a mid-season tour of New Zealand by the Australia national rugby league team. The Australians played nine matches on tour, including two tests against the New Zealand national rugby league team. The tour began on 17 June and finished on 10 July.

Leadership 
Brian Carlson was both the captain and the coach of the touring side. Carlson did not play in the Second Test and tour vice-captain Barry Muir led Australia in that match. 
In the two matches in which neither Carlson nor Muir played, the Kangaroos were captained by Reg Gasnier (against Taranaki) and Ian Walsh (against Auckland).
The team was managed by Jack Kessey of Newtown, New South Wales and G.W. (Jock) Allen of Toowooomba, Queensland.

Touring squad 
The Rugby League News published 
 details of the touring team including the players' ages and weights; and 
 a summary of match results and players' appearances and points scoring. 
Match details - listing surnames of both teams and the point scorers - were included in E.E. Christensen's Official Rugby League Yearbook, as was a summary of the players' point-scoring. 
Beattie, Day, Gehrke, Gil, Muir, Paterson and Rasmussen were selected from Queensland clubs. Beaven, Crowe and Owen were selected from clubs in New South Wales Country areas. The balance of the squad had played for Sydney based clubs during the 1961 season.

Tour 
The Australians played nine matches on the tour, winning seven matches and losing the last two.

First test

Second test

References 

Australia national rugby league team tours
Rugby league tours of New Zealand
Kangaroo tour of New Zealand
Kangaroo tour of New Zealand